Şuvaş (also, Shuash and Shuvash) is a village in the Astara Rayon of Azerbaijan.  The village forms part of the municipality of Səncərədi.

References 

Populated places in Astara District